Magnus Norman was the defending champion, but chose to compete at Stuttgart in the same week.

Marcelo Ríos won the title by defeating Mariano Puerta 7–6(7–1), 4–6, 6–3 in the final.

Seeds

Draw

Finals

Top half

Bottom half

References

External links
 Official results archive (ATP)
 Official results archive (ITF)

Croatia Open - Singles
2000 Singles
2000 in Croatian tennis